The Maynard carbine was a breech-loaded carbine used by cavalry in the American Civil War. The First Model was manufactured between 1858 and 1859. About 5,000 were made. In United States service it was distributed to the 9th Pennsylvania and 1st Wisconsin cavalry regiments, United States Marines aboard the USS Saratoga and the United States Revenue Cutter Service. About 3,000 Maynard carbines were in Confederate hands during the war; 5,000 in .35 caliber were purchased by Florida, 650 in .50 by Georgia, and 325 in .50 and 300 in .35 by Mississippi. Around 800 were purchased by militias in South Carolina and Louisiana. The Second Model or Model 1863 was manufactured between 1863 and 1865. Over 20,000 were made. This model lacked the tape primer and stock patch box, and was used by the 9th and 11th Indiana cavalry regiments and 11th Regiment Tennessee Volunteer Cavalry, among others. The Maynard had a good reputation for long-range accuracy, and Confederate sharpshooters made extensive use of it, especially during the Siege of Charleston.

It was highly praised by the soldiers – Private Toby of the 1st Mississippi Infantry stated that it was "warranted to shoot twelve times a minute, and carry a ball effectually 1600 yards. Nothing to do with Maynard rifle but load her up, turn her North, and pull trigger; if twenty of them don't clean out all Yankeedom, then I'm a liar, that's all."

Mechanical operation
When the gun's lever was depressed, the barrel rose, opening the breech for loading. Afterwards the lever was raised to close the gun's breech. Once cocked, the loaded weapon could be primed by either placing a percussion cap directly on its nipple or by using Maynard's priming system to advance a primer to the nipple. The brass Maynard cartridge did not have an integral percussion cap; a small hole in the middle of its base fired it when the external cap was detonated. The cartridge, which had a wide rim permitting swift extraction, was reloadable up to 100 times. This proved to be a significant feature for the Confederate troops equipped with it. Another significant feature was that the use of a metallic cartridge prevented gas escape at the breech, a serious concern for early externally primed breechloaders.

Gallery

See also
 Rifles in the American Civil War

References

Smith, Graham (2011). "Maynard Carbine." Civil War Weapons. Chartwell, p. 95.

External links
Carbines, Revolving Rifles and Repeating Rifles
Army of the Cumberland

Further reading
A.T. Botkin, A Civil War Treasury of Tales, Legends and Folklore, Random House Trade Publishing, 

American Civil War rifles
Carbines
Rifles of the United States
Single-shot rifles
Weapons of the Confederate States of America